is a Japanese singer and TV personality, known for his outspoken views and  style.

He recorded a number of hit songs as a male enka singer in the 1960s and 1970s. The most well-known of his songs include "Sasoriza no Onna" and "Yanagase Blues". His career went into decline in the mid-1970s, but revived about 10 years later when he adopted his current style. He makes frequent appearances on TV talk and variety shows, and is also known as a regular performer on Kōhaku Uta Gassen, the popular New Year's Eve music show. One of the highlights of that show is his annual contest with enka singer Sachiko Kobayashi for the most elaborate costume.

Mikawa is openly gay.

Discography 
  (1965)
   (1966)
   (1967)
   (1968)
   (1969)
   (1970)
   (1971)
   (1972)
   (1972)
   (1972)
   (1974)
   (2009)

References

External links 
 Discography

1946 births
Living people
20th-century Japanese male singers
21st-century Japanese male singers
Japanese television personalities
Musicians from Nagano Prefecture
Gay singers
Japanese gay musicians
Japanese LGBT singers
People from Nagano Prefecture